Zamanabad (also Romanized as Zamānābād) is a village in Rezqabad Rural District, in the Central District of Esfarayen County, North Khorasan Province, Iran. At the 2006 census, its population was 13, in 5 families.

References 

Populated places in Esfarayen County